Interstate 55 (I-55) is a part of the Interstate Highway System that spans  from LaPlace, Louisiana, to Chicago, Illinois.  Within the state of Louisiana, the highway travels  from the national southern terminus at I-10 in LaPlace to the Mississippi state line north of Kentwood.

The route is located in the southeastern portion of Louisiana and parallels the older U.S. Highway 51 (US 51) corridor. While passing through the city of Hammond, I-55 intersects two of the state's major east–west routes, I-12 and US 190. It also serves the smaller city of Ponchatoula, as well as the towns of Amite City and Kentwood.

It also serves as an important hurricane evacuation route for the region. I-55 was opened in several stages beginning in 1960 with a bypass of Ponchatoula and Hammond. The southern  of I-55, consisting of a twin-span viaduct through the Manchac swamp, was completed in 1979 and is one of the longest bridges in the world.

Route description

Manchac swamp

A pair of ramps accommodate traffic heading to and from the city with the remaining movements provided by exit 1, a nearby half-diamond interchange with US 51. The first  of I-55 consist of a four-lane concrete viaduct known as the Manchac Swamp Bridge, which cuts through the thickly wooded swamp along the western shore of Lake Pontchartrain. For this entire stretch, I-55 is cosigned with US 51, and the latter's ground-level pre-Interstate alignment serves as a frontage road along the northbound span. The structure is only  shorter than the nearby Lake Pontchartrain Causeway, the world's longest continuous bridge over water, and both serve to connect the New Orleans area with its suburban outgrowth north of the lake.

After , I-55 elevates higher to cross Pass Manchac, a short waterway connecting Lake Pontchartrain with Lake Maurepas that historically served as an international boundary during the 18th and 19th centuries. It is currently the boundary between Louisiana's St. John the Baptist and Tangipahoa parishes. The community situated along the pass is called Manchac and features a number of boat houses and fishing camps flanking the highway.

Tangipahoa Parish
I-55 immediately curves to the northwest while U.S. Highway 51 Business (US 51 Bus.) splits off straight ahead into the small city of Ponchatoula. The surroundings having transitioned from swampland to pine forest, I-55 skirts the western edge of Ponchatoula, which is served by a cloverleaf interchange with Louisiana Highway 22 (LA 22). US 51 departs from the Interstate at the following exit, and both routes enter the larger adjacent city of Hammond. Shortly afterward, I-55 engages in a full cloverleaf interchange with I-12, a northern bypass of the New Orleans metropolitan area. Two further exits serve Hammond. The first connects to US 190, which parallels I-12 through the region and passes through downtown Hammond. The second connects to LA 3234 (University Avenue) and provides access to Southeastern Louisiana University.

All further exits are diamond interchanges with rural east–west state highways primarily connecting to the various communities along US 51. These include LA 442 to Tickfaw, LA 40 to Independence, LA 16 to Amite City, LA 1048 to Roseland, LA 10 to Greensburg, and LA 440 to Tangipahoa.

North of Tangipahoa, I-55 passes through the town of Kentwood and has its final exit in Louisiana, which connects to LA 38.  later, the Louisiana Welcome Center provides a rest area and services for southbound drivers entering the state. Continuing northward, I-55 crosses into Mississippi and proceeds toward the cities of McComb and Jackson.

Route classification and data
I-55 alternates between a rural and urban Interstate over the course of its route, as determined by the Louisiana Department of Transportation and Development (DOTD). Daily traffic volume in 2013 peaked at 41,800 vehicles in Hammond, staying between approximately 15,000 and 25,000 vehicles otherwise.

I-55 is a designated hurricane evacuation route for the New Orleans metropolitan area and southeastern Louisiana in general. A contraflow lane reversal may be instituted from I-12 northward into Mississippi to facilitate the movement of traffic out of the area.

The entire I-55 frontage road (old US 51) south of Ponchatoula is part of the Southern Swamps Byway in the state-designated system of tourist routes known as the Louisiana Scenic Byways. This byway also follows the route of LA 22 southwest from Ponchatoula through the Maurepas swamp to the town of Sorrento.

The portion of I-55 within Tangipahoa Parish has been officially designated as the Congressman Jimmy Morrison Highway since 2003. During his lengthy term in the US House of Representatives, Hammond native James H. Morrison (1908–2000) was responsible for securing 40 percent of Louisiana's Interstate Highway System and was instrumental in getting I-12 routed through the city.

History

Planning and initial construction
Before the existence of I-55, the main traffic route connecting New Orleans with Jackson, Mississippi, and Memphis, Tennessee, was US 51. Beginning in the late 1930s, the US 51 corridor was included in preliminary plans for what would become the Interstate Highway System. Construction of the system was finally authorized by the Federal Aid Highway Act of 1956, which was signed into law by President Dwight D. Eisenhower on June 29 of that year.

As the existing U.S. Highways were adequately handling traffic through rural areas in most cases, the Louisiana Department of Highways decided on a strategy to relieve traffic in urban areas first. A bypass around Ponchatoula and Hammond was listed by the department as 1 of 10 priority projects and was therefore the first section of I-55 to be placed under contract. Completed in the autumn of 1960 at a cost of $3.5 million (equivalent to $ in ), it was one of the first Interstate Highway segments to be opened to traffic in Louisiana. Spanning , the bypass was designed to connect seamlessly with US 51 at either end, facilitating the flow of traffic around the westside of both downtown areas and eliminating four right-angle turns.

It was the first roadway segment in Louisiana to be paved using an economical and time-saving method known as slip forming, or continuously poured concrete. A  section of I-55 from Roseland, Louisiana, to Magnolia, Mississippi, was opened jointly by the two state highway departments on June 16, 1967. The  within Louisiana costed $9.8 million (equivalent to $ in ). The resulting  gap between Hammond and Roseland was opened in the autumn of 1969 at a cost of $12.6 million (equivalent to $ in ). This completed the highway between the cities of Hammond, Louisiana, and Jackson, Mississippi.

Manchac swamp
The southern portion of I-55 between LaPlace and Ponchatoula was constructed last. Building the highway through the Manchac swamp would be the most expensive and difficult project on the state's portion of I-55, as it had been for US 51 four decades earlier. When construction of the Interstate Highway System was authorized in 1956, the swamp section of US 51 was in the process of being entirely rebuilt on an improved embankment adjacent to the original 1927 roadbed, which was narrow and suffering from subsidence. As part of this project, the original bascule bridge across Pass Manchac was being replaced with a higher fixed span. The initial plans for I-55 called for utilizing the new US 51 roadbed and bridge upon completion, but, since both were designed to accommodate two lanes of traffic, an additional two lanes would have to be added later to satisfy Interstate standards. The new Pass Manchac Bridge was opened in August 1957, and the reconstructed two-lane US 51 was completed in stages between 1962 and 1964.

In 1970, the final portion of I-10 connecting the future I-55 with New Orleans was nearing completion. This consisted of a twin-span viaduct across the LaBranche swamp and the Bonnet Carré Spillway. That year, construction began on a $14.5-million (equivalent to $ in ) interchange between the two freeways. In November 1971, the Louisiana Department of Highways announced that the plans for I-55 had changed to consist of twin two-lane viaducts from the Manchac area southward with the existing ground-level US 51 serving as a frontage road alongside the northbound span. While greatly increasing the cost of construction, the elevated spans would not be subject to flooding and would require less maintenance in the long run. The frontage road would also allow the surrounding area to remain accessible to local hunters and fishermen. The highway department and local residents lobbied to have the entire route elevated on the basis that a ground-level roadway north of Manchac would negatively impact the swamp's ecosystem and also be unstable in the long term. Due to the cost element, this proposal was turned down by the Federal Highway Administration (FHWA). In October 1974, however, the agency relented after overwhelming local opposition and an environmental impact survey were presented during a series of public hearings.

Meanwhile, construction of the elevated I-55 had begun in November 1973. A canal was dredged through the swamp along the entire right-of-way, allowing prestressed concrete roadway segments to be floated in by barge from the contractor's plant across Lake Pontchartrain. On September 13, 1976—one month before the new Pass Manchac Bridge was placed under construction—a barge struck the parallel US 51 bridge, knocking a  section of it into the water. Several vehicles plunged off the bridge, but the only fatality was ironically an employee of the construction firm building the I-55 spans who happened to be traveling on the highway at that time. After an initial estimate of six months, the bridge was repaired in half that time, aided by the proximity of the I-55 construction crew. It was reopened to traffic on December 17, 1976, at the same time the  section of I-55 between I-10 and the Ruddock exit was ready for travel. The remainder of the distance north from Ruddock to Ponchatoula, including the new Pass Manchac bridge, was completed and opened to traffic following its dedication by Governor Edwin Edwards on May 25, 1979. Its final cost was approximately $159 million (equivalent to $ in ), bringing the total construction cost of I-55 in Louisiana to about $181 million (equivalent to $ in ).

Worst road status and reconstruction
The first major repair project on I-55 was carried out during 1988 and 1989. It involved an $8.1-million (equivalent to $ in ) reconstruction of much of the Ponchatoula–Hammond bypass, which was the oldest portion of the highway. Another project before the turn of the century was the addition of a diamond interchange at LA 3234 (Wardline Road) near Hammond, improving access to Southeastern Louisiana University. After almost two decades in the works, this project was completed in the autumn of 1998.

By the end of the 20th century, the concrete pavement on I-55 north of Hammond had significantly deteriorated, giving the highway a reputation as one of the worst in the state. Its appearance atop a 2010 Reader's Digest list of "The 7 Worst Roads in America" was reported in the local media. Between 2008 and 2011, a $79.3-million (equivalent to $ in ) project was carried out that gave the entire stretch of I-55 from Hammond to the Mississippi state line a complete overhaul. This was accomplished by rubblizing the existing concrete surface to serve as a base for a new asphalt surface. Though shortening the life expectancy of the highway, this method had the benefit of being quicker and more cost-effective than replacing the concrete panels and would require less maintenance over time. Additionally, since I-55 is a designated hurricane evacuation route, the highway could be fully opened to traffic during construction within 48 hours' notice if needed.

Exit list

See also

Notes

References

External links

Maps / GIS Data Homepage, Louisiana Department of Transportation and Development
Southern Swamps Byway at Louisiana Scenic Byways

 Louisiana
55
Transportation in St. John the Baptist Parish, Louisiana
Transportation in Tangipahoa Parish, Louisiana